The 2012 United States House of Representatives elections in New Hampshire were held on Tuesday, November 6, 2012 to elect the two U.S. representatives from the state of New Hampshire. The elections coincided with the elections of other federal and state offices, including a quadrennial presidential election.

Overview

District 1

The redrawn 1st district currently represents all municipalities in Belknap (except for the town of Center Harbor); the entirety of Carroll, and Strafford counties; all of Rockingham County; the municipalities of Bedford, Goffstown, Manchester, and Merrimack in Hillsborough County; the town of Campton in Grafton County; and, the town of Hooksett in Merrimack County.

Republican Frank Guinta, who has represented the 1st district since January 2011 ran for re-election.

Republican primary

Candidates

Nominee
Frank Guinta, incumbent U.S. Representative

Eliminated in primary
Vern Clough, retired barber
Rick Parent, candidate for this seat in 2010

Primary results

Democratic primary

Candidates

Nominee
Carol Shea-Porter, former U.S. Representative

Withdrawn
Joanne Dowdell, businesswoman and Democratic National Committeewoman 
Matthew Hancock, software developer  
Andrew Hosmer, businessman

Primary results

Libertarian primary
Brendan Kelly, the chairman of the Seabrook Board of Selectmen, ran as a Libertarian.

General election

Endorsements

Polling

Predictions

Results

District 2

The redrawn 2nd district will represent all of Cheshire, Coos, Grafton (except for the town of Campton), Merrimack (except for the town of Hooksett), and Sullivan counties; most of Hillsborough County; the towns of Atkinson, Deerfield, Northwood, Salem, and Windham in Rockingham County; and, the town of Center Harbor in Belknap County.

Republican Charles Bass, represented the 2nd district from 1995 to 2007, and since 2011 ran for re-election.

Republican primary

Candidates

Nominee
Charles Bass, incumbent U.S. Representative

Eliminated in primary
Gerald Beloin
Will Dean
Miroslaw Dziedzic
Dennis Lamare, insurance agent and candidate for Senate in 2010  Bass defeated Kuster by 1% in 2010.

Primary results

Democratic primary

Candidates

Nominee
Ann McLane Kuster, attorney and nominee for this seat in 2010

Primary results

Libertarian primary
Hardy Macia, owner of an iPhone/Android app development company, ran as a Libertarian.

General election

Endorsements

Polling

Predictions

Results

References

External links
Election Division at the New Hampshire Secretary of State
United States House of Representatives elections in New Hampshire, 2012 at Ballotpedia
New Hampshire U.S. House from OurCampaigns.com
Campaign contributions for U.S. Congressional races in New Hampshire from OpenSecrets
Outside spending at the Sunlight Foundation

New Hampshire
2012
United States House of Representatives